All Night Long is a 1981 American romantic comedy film directed by Jean-Claude Tramont and starring Barbra Streisand, Gene Hackman, Diane Ladd, Dennis Quaid, Kevin Dobson, and William Daniels. It was written by W. D. Richter.

Plot
George Dupler (Gene Hackman), a married man nearing middle age, is demoted after a temper tantrum at work (throwing a chair out of  his boss's window) and reduced to working as the midnight-shift manager of an all-night pharmacy/convenience store.

George's 18-year-old son, Freddie (Dennis Quaid), is having an affair with an older, married woman, who also happens to be Freddie's fourth cousin. George advises Freddie to stop the affair before it leads to any trouble, but Freddie declares that he might love her. One night at the store, George finally meets the woman, Cheryl (Barbra Streisand), an untalented singer-songwriter married to a volatile firefighter, Bobby (Kevin Dobson), and she begins to show an interest in him. After a while, the interest is mutual.

George goes to Cheryl's house to return her cigarette lighter. She offers to show George the paint job Freddie has done in her bedroom. George and Cheryl are about to get intimate, when Freddie comes over to see Cheryl for another tryst. George escapes before Freddie could see him, but Cheryl decides to tell Freddie about the affair she is having with his dad. The next day, when George is trying to sleep, and his wife, Helen (Diane Ladd), is having a French class, Freddie confronts his father, trying to fight him. Helen hears about the affair and George leaves. When she demands a divorce, George agrees.

George ends up quitting his job and leasing a loft where he can pursue his dream of being an inventor. George goes to an anniversary party where everybody he knows is there, including his family, plus Cheryl and Bobby. He realizes Bobby is aware of the affair with his wife. George takes Cheryl away from the party and her husband. Even though Cheryl loves him, she thinks he is too good for her.

Cheryl goes to the fire station where Bobby works to talk to him. Bobby ends up yelling at her and is about to hit her when the fire alarm goes off. He and all of the firemen leave, whereupon we see that it was George who reported the nonexistent fire.

Cheryl moves into George's place. Freddie has accepted the situation and helps her move in, showing that he and his dad have reconciled.

Cast
 Gene Hackman as George Dupler
 Barbra Streisand as Cheryl Gibbons
 Dennis Quaid as Freddie Dupler
 Diane Ladd as Helen Dupler
 Kevin Dobson as Bobby Gibbons
 William Daniels as Richard H. Copleston
 Hamilton Camp as Buggoms
 Faith Minton as Holdup Woman
 Terry Kiser as Ultra-Save Day Manager
 Charles Siebert as Nevins
 Vernee Watson-Johnson as Emily (as Vernee Watson)
 Raleigh Bond as Ultra-Save Doctor
 Annie Girardot as French Teacher
 Ann Doran as Grandmother Gibbons
 James Nolan as Grandfather Gibbons (as Jim Nolan)
 Judy Kerr as Joan Gibbons
 Marlyn Gates as Jennifer Gibbons

Production
The film was originally planned as a low-budget release, with Hackman and Lisa Eichhorn. Streisand's then-agent, Sue Mengers, who was married to the film's director, Jean-Claude Tramont, suggested Barbra for the part instead of Eichhorn, even though filming already was under way. Streisand was paid $4 million for starring in this film, the highest salary for an actor up to that time.  Several biographies suggest that because of the film's subsequent failure at the box office, Streisand fired Mengers.

Prominent in the musical soundtrack is "La Violetera", a composition by José Padilla which had been featured previously in Charlie Chaplin's City Lights.

Reception
The film received mostly negative reviews, though some critics cited Streisand's performance as one of her best. On review aggregator Rotten Tomatoes, 33% of 9 reviews are positive, and the average rating is 5.4/10.

Stephen Holden, in Rolling Stone magazine, gave the film a positive review, adding that Streisand's performance suggested Marilyn Monroe. Pauline Kael in The New Yorker was full of praise: "The director, Jean-Claude Tramont, a Belgian who has worked in American television, is a sophisticated jokester. There may be a suggestion of Lubitsch and of Max Ophüls in his approach, and there is more than a suggestion of Jacques Tati. Gene Hackman, whose specialty has been believable, lived-in characters, gives one of his most likable performances." Gary Arnold of The Washington Post also praised Hackman's performance, calling it "the most endearing of his career, an impression of frustrated but resilient middle-class masculinity that should evoke as much recognition and rooting interest among men as women seemed to derive from Ellen Burstyn's role in Alice Doesn't Live Here Anymore."

Awards
Streisand was nominated for a Golden Raspberry Award for Worst Actress for her performance. Gene Hackman was nominated for a 2nd place National Society of Film Critics Award for Best Actor for his performance.

Box office
The movie was a flop.  It opened at No. 1 on the American film charts with an opening weekend of $1,391,000. The Independent Movie Data Base website lists the film's total U.S. gross as less than $4.5 million.  In William Goldman's Adventures in the Screen Trade, Goldman states the budget, originally $3 million, ballooned to $15 million, in part because of the addition of Streisand. With prints and advertising costs, Goldman states the studio lost at least $20 million on the film.

References

Sources

External links
 
 
 
 
 
 
 Barbra Streisand Archives: Film - "All Night Long" page 

1981 films
1981 romantic comedy films
American romantic comedy films
Universal Pictures films
Films with screenplays by W. D. Richter
Films scored by Ira Newborn
1980s English-language films
1980s American films